Enchi College of Education is a teacher education college in Enchi, Western North Region, Ghana. It is one of 46 public colleges of education in Ghana. The college participated in the DFID-funded T-TEL programme. Mr. Philip Ntaah has been the Principal since May 2019.

In May 2019, it was announced that Enchi College is affiliated to the University of Ghana.

Education 
Enchi College of Education offers the new Bachelor of Education programmes and they include the B.Ed Early Grade Education, B.Ed Upper Primary Education and B.Ed JHS Education (with specialisms in English, French, RME, Special needs, Geography, Social Studies, History). In the 2020/2021 academic year, 400 students were enrolled on the new B.Ed. degree programme of the  University of Ghana

History 
Enchi College of Education was established in 1965 as a male institution and became co-educational a decade later with the admission of thirty-five women in 1975. It re-located to its present site in 1978. Enchi College started with 4-year post middle Teacher's Certificate ‘A’ programme. The college is located at the Aowin Municipality in the Western-North Region of the republic of Ghana.  The original campus was sited at the southern end of the town, now being used as the Nana Brentu Secondary Technical School. The first principal was Mr. Addisson. The college was converted into a three-year post secondary teacher training college in 1988. The college's 56 years of existence so far has been marked by a number of achievements. With an initial enrolment of 70 students and 9 academic staff, the college now has a total enrolment of one thousand and seventy eight teacher trainees. Also, the college has 96 staff, both teaching and non-teaching. In the 2002/2003 academic year, the University of Education, Winneba, chose the college as the Western Regional Centre for the Distance Education Programme to prepare certificate ‘A’ teachers for Diploma in Basic Education. In October 2019, the college started the Bachelor of Education Programmes. It is currently running distance programmes with the University of Cape Coast, University of Winneba and Jackson College of Education alongside its regular programmes. The college has been able to produce over 7000 teachers, most of whom are currently occupying very enviable positions in the country.

Despite its busy teaching lessons and practice schedule, there are still many ways for students to get involve in extra-curricula activities. The college proudly produces some sport personalities who excelled at regional, national and beyond national level.

Notable alumni 
In politics, the College also produced some political figures in Ghana's history. The former Western Regional Minister and a current Member of the Ghana Parliament for Sefwi-Wiawso is a product of Enchi College of Education. Others notable personalities: Hon Mathias Kwame Ntow (MP for Aowin constituency, Western region) Madam Victoria Aidoo (Principal of the Enchi College of Education), etc.

Nelson Ackumey (1991-1994), former United States Army track star and a veteran whose performance in track and fields at the time drew much crowd to Enchi park, is one of few.

References 

Colleges of Education in Ghana
Educational institutions established in 1965
1965 establishments in Ghana
Western North Region